The Bundesverband der Deutschen Industrie (BDI), Federation of German Industries e. V. is the leading organization of German industry and industry-related service providers. It represents 39 industry associations and more than 100,000 companies with around 8 million employees. Membership is voluntary. A total of 15 state representations represent the interests of the economy at the regional level. Headquarters of the BDI is in the Haus der Deutschen Wirtschaft (house of the German economy) in Berlin; Between 1950 and 1999 this was in the House of German Industry in Cologne. In addition, the BDI has other offices abroad and is therefore represented internationally. President of the BDI is since January 1, 2021 Siegfried Russwurm.

As an umbrella organization, the federation is responsible for the perception and promotion of all concerns of the industries combined under the auspices of the BDI. However, this does not entitle it to represent social issues. This function is reserved for the Confederation of German Employers' Associations (BDA). The BDI statute limits the circle of members to leading industrial associations and working groups (§ 4, para. 2). As a result, sole proprietors or corporate networks can not obtain membership. From a political science point of view, the BDI has been described as an interest group in the association sectors "Economy and Labor" as well as "an investor top association of industrial sector and trade associations". As an advocacy group of the industry, the leading association operates interest articulation, following the process of forming an opinion within the association. The BDI lobbies globally in the sense of industrially active enterprises and is in "all economic relevant legislative processes heard."

Presidents
 1949–1971: Fritz Berg
 1972–1976: Hans Günter Sohl
 1977 (January–October): Hanns Martin Schleyer
 1978 (January–September): Nikolaus Fasolt
 1978–1984: Rolf Rodenstock
 1985–1986: Hans Joachim Langmann
 1987–1990: Tyll Necker
 1991–1992: Heinrich Weiss
 1992–1994: Tyll Necker
 1995–2000: Hans-Olaf Henkel
 2001–2004: Michael Rogowski
 2005–2008: Jürgen Thumann
 2009–2012: Hans-Peter Keitel
 2013–2016: Ulrich Grillo
 since 2017: Dieter Kempf
since 2021: Siegfried Russwurm

Member associations
The association represents the following 39 member associations:
Association of the Automotive Industry (VDA)
Main Association of the German Construction Industry e.V.
Federal Association of Building Materials - Stones and Eros (BBS)
Association of Consulting Engineers e.V. (VBI)
Biotechnology Industry Organization Germany e.V. (BIO Germany eV)
Association of the Chemical Industry e.V. (VCI)
Central Association Electrical Engineering- and Electronics Industry e.V. (ZVEI)
Federal Association of the German Disposal, Water and Raw Materials Management e.V. (BDE)
Federal Association of Natural Gas, Petroleum and Geonergy e. V. (BVEG)
Verband Forschender Arzneimittelhersteller e. V. (vfa) (Association of Research-Based Pharmaceutical Companies)
Central Real Estate Committee e. V. (ZIA)
Association of the Potash and Salt Industry e. V. (VKS)
Federal Association of German Foundry Industry e.V. (BDG)
Federal Association Glass Industry e.V.
Federal Association for Information Technology, Telecommunications and New Media e.V. (BITKOM)
Federation of Ceramic Industry e.V. (BVKI)
Federal Association of the German Aerospace Industry e.V. (BDLI)
Federal Association of the German Aviation Economy e.V. (BDL)
Mechanical Engineering Industry Association (VDMA)
Trade Association Metals e.V. (WVM)
Mineral Oil Economy Association e.V. (MWV)
Employers and Business Association of Mobility and Transport Services e.V. (Agv MoVe)
Association of German Paper Mills e.V. (VDP)
Federal Association of the Pharmaceutical Industry e.V. (BPI)
Association of Raw Materials and Mining e.V. (VRB)
Federal Association of the German Security and Defense Industry e.V. (BDSV)
Trade Association Steel
Trade Association Steel Construction and Energy Technology e.V. (WV SET)
Trade Association Steel and Metal Processing e.V. (WSM)
Association of the German Textile- and Fashion Industry e.V.
Federal Association of German Tourism e.V. (BTW)
Association of TÜV e.V.
Association of the German Interconnected Grid Systems Economy e.V. (VdV)
German Cigarette Association e.V. (DZV)
Association of the Sugar Industry e.V. (VdZ)
Industry Group: Federal Association of Jewelry-, Watch-, Silverware- and related Industries e.V.
Industry Group: Association of the German Vending Machine Industry e.V. (VDAI)
Industry Group: Association of the German Dental Industry e.V. (VDDI)
Industry Group: Association of the German Gaming Industry e. V.

Cooperations
 Confederation of German Employers' Associations
 Hans-Erich-Nossack-Preis
 European Movement Germany

References

External links
 

Lobbying in Germany
Industry in Germany
Political advocacy groups in Europe
Organizations established in 1949